This article lists described species of the family Asilidae start with letter U.

A
B
C
D
E
F
G
H
I
J
K
L
M
N
O
P
Q
R
S
T
U
V
W
Y
Z

List of Species

Genus Udenopogon
 Udenopogon inscriptus (Becker, 1913)

Genus Ujguricola
 Ujguricola pergrisea (Lehr, 1970)

References 

 
Asilidae